According to the mythology of the Cook Islands, Amai-te-rangi was a cannibal and demon who attempted to entrap Ngaru. Ngaru, however, ascended and successfully defeated Amai-te-rangi with the help of his grandfather, Mokoroa.

References

Sky and weather gods
Mangaia mythology